Haleon plc is a British multinational consumer healthcare company with headquarters in Weybridge, England. It is the largest consumer healthcare business in the world, with brands including Sensodyne toothpaste, Panadol and Advil painkillers and Centrum vitamins. The company is a global leader in over the counter medicines with a 7.3 percent market share.

Haleon was established on 18 July 2022 as a corporate spin-off from GSK.

Sir David Lewis is chairman, with Brian McNamara as CEO. Haleon is listed on the London Stock Exchange and is a component of the FTSE 100, with a secondary listing on the New York Stock Exchange. Annual sales amounted to around £10 billion across 120 markets in 2020.

History
GSK and Pfizer merged their consumer healthcare businesses in 2019. GSK owned just over two thirds of the joint venture, and Pfizer held the remainder.

GSK announced plans to spin-off Haleon in 2018, in order to give the "tired drugmaker extra focus and firepower by gearing up and hiving off the consumer division".

Unilever offered £50 billion for the business in 2022, in a bid which GSK rejected. Nestlé examined the possibility of a bid in conjunction with Reckitt.

A proposed $600 million spin-off of the ChapStick lip care brand was mooted in 2023.

Operations
Oral health accounted for 28.5 percent of revenue in 2021.

Gross assets amounted to over £45 billion on 31 March 2022.

Brands

Brands include:

Ownership
As of 2022, Pfizer owns 32 percent of Haleon, while GSK retains a 13 percent stake.

References

External links
 

 
2022 establishments in England
Companies based in Surrey
Companies listed on the London Stock Exchange
Corporate spin-offs
Dental companies
Health care companies of England
Manufacturing companies of England
Manufacturing companies established in 2022
Multinational companies headquartered in England
Personal care companies
GSK plc
Pfizer
Weybridge, Surrey